Natalia Cabrerizo (born 24 July 1980) is a Spanish former freestyle swimmer who competed in the 2000 Summer Olympics.

References

1980 births
Living people
Spanish female freestyle swimmers
Olympic swimmers of Spain
Swimmers at the 2000 Summer Olympics